South Carolina Highway 118 (SC 118) is a  state highway in the U.S. state of South Carolina. The highway is a beltway around downtown Aiken. The highway is officially designated on the road around the southwestern, western, and northern sides of the city. However, it is also concurrent with SC 302 on its southeastern quadrant.

Route description
According to the South Carolina Department of Transportation, SC 118 begins at an intersection with SC 302 (Silver Bluff Road) in southern Aiken, within Aiken County. It travels to the west-northwest, concurrent with SC 19 Truck. The two highways travel north of Houndslake Country Club and Aiken Elementary School before heading to the north-northwest. They cross over the Sand River. They also intersect SC 421 (Augusta Road). Just afterward, they travel underneath a railroad bridge and intersect U.S. Route 1 (US 1) and US 78 (Jefferson Davis Highway/Richland Avenue). At this intersection, US 1 Truck/US 78 Truck join the concurrency. They briefly travel outside of the city limits of Aiken. The four highways curve to the northeast and travel through University of South Carolina Aiken. At University Parkway, they re-enter Aiken. Just after Vaucluse Road, they curve to the east-southeast. Just before Arbor Court, they curve to the southeast. They curve to the east-southeast and intersect SC 19 (Laurens Street).

At the intersection with SC 19, SC 19 Truck ends. The three highways pass Aiken High School. They cross some railroad tracks and have a second intersection with US 1 (York Street). Here, US 1 Truck ends. US 78 Truck/SC 118 travels to the southeast and leave the city limits of Aiken again. They curve to the south-southeast and intersect SC 4/SC 302 (Wagener Road). Here, SC 302 joins the concurrency. They curve to the south-southwest and have a second intersection with US 78 (Charleston Highway). Here, US 78 Truck ends. SC 118/SC 302 curve to the southeast, re-enter Aiken, and pass Citizens Park. They travel between Kennedy Middle School and Millbrook Elementary School and travel south of Virginia Acres Park. South of the park, they intersect SC 19 (Whiskey Road). Here, SC 19 Truck joins the concurrency. They curve to the west-southwest and meet Silver Bluff Road, where SC 302 turns left.

History

Major intersections

See also

References

External links

 
 SC 118 at Virginia Highways' South Carolina Highways Annex

118
Transportation in Aiken County, South Carolina
Beltways in the United States
Aiken, South Carolina